The 2015–16 season is Inter's 27th consecutive season in the Primera Division de Futbol in their 38th year in existence. This season Inter participate in the Primera Division, Copa del Rey, Copa de España, and the UEFA Futsal Cup. The season covers the period from 11 September 2015 to 30 April 2016 (end of regular season).

Club
Head coach:  Jesús Velasco

Squad

Competitions

Overall

Overview

Primera Division

League table

Results summary

Results by matchday

Matches

Copa del Rey

The 2015–16 Copa del Rey is the 6th staging of the Copa del Rey de Futsal. The competition started on 22 September with First Round matches. The Final date and venue are to be decided yet. Inter Movistar are the defending champions and joined the competition in the Second Round.

Copa de España

The Copa de España Quarter Final Draw was made on 28 December 2015.

UEFA Futsal Cup

The 2015–16 UEFA Futsal Cup is the 30th edition of Europe's premier club futsal tournament, and the 15th edition under the current UEFA Futsal Cup format organized by UEFA. Qualifying rounds started on 25 August 2015. Inter Movistar entered the competition in the Elite Round which started on 12 November 2015.

Group A

Final tournament
The hosts of the final tournament was selected by UEFA from the four qualified teams on 11 December 2015 and will be staged by Inter FS at the Palacio Multiusos de Guadalajara in Guadalajara on 21 or 22 and 23 or 24 April 2016. The draw for the final tournament will be held in spring 2016 at the host city. The four teams are drawn into two knockout semi-finals without any restrictions. The semi-final winners advance to the final, while the losers play in the third place match.

Qualified teams
 Inter FS (hosts)
 ASD Pescara
 TTG-Ugra Yugorsk
 SL Benfica

Semi-final

Final

Statistics

Appearances and goals

Last updated on 18 June 2016.

Clean sheets
Last updated on 27 February 2016.

Hat-tricks
Last updated on 27 February 2016.

Note
4 Player scored 4 goals

References

2015–16 in Spanish futsal